Michele Riondino (born 18 May 1978) is an Italian academic and canon law scholar currently based in Sydney, Australia. He was appointed the foundation Professor of Canon Law at Australian Catholic University (ACU) in February 2019, and has been the inaugural Director of ACU’s Canon Law Centre since September 2019.

Early life and education 
Michele Riondino was born and raised in Vittorio Veneto, a small city in the shadow of the Dolomites, northern Italy. The youngest of three siblings, he studied piano as a child and attended St Joseph’s College, where he received a Catholic primary and secondary education.

Riondino left home to study law in Milan at the Catholic University of the Sacred Heart and Carlo Cattaneo University. During this degree he spent one semester as a visiting student at the University of Westminster Law School in London. Riondino obtained his law degree with a thesis on family mediation in Europe. He then moved to Rome to specialise in canon law. Here he undertook a master's degree in science of marriage and family, with a major in canon law, at the Pontifical John Paul II Institute for Studies on Marriage and Family. Later, he completed a Bachelor of Philosophy and Bachelor of Theology at the Pontifical Lateran University, during which he spent one year in Granada (Spain), while also attending the School of Theology.

Finally, Riondino obtained a PhD in Canon Law (summa cum laude) at the Lateran University, at which time he completed his dissertation, Giustizia riparativa e mediazione nel diritto penale canonico  (i.e. “Restorative justice and mediation in the penal law of the Church”), supervised by Prof M. J. Arroba Conde and Prof L. Eusebi. This dissertation, which was published in its entirety, earned Riondino the Sub Auspiciis Lateranensibus prize for 2010’s best doctoral thesis.

Academic career 
Riondino has researched and written on canon law, matrimonial law, restorative justice and mediation, the teaching function of the Church in relation to the Magisterium, sanctions in the Church, and international children’s rights with a particular focus on the right to education. He has published papers in Italian, Spanish, Portuguese, and English, in several law journals, such as Apollinaris, JUS, Revista Española de Derecho Canónico, Studia Canonica, E-Journal of International and Comparative Labour Studies, Vergentis, Il Diritto di Famiglia e delle Persone, Anuario de Derecho Canónico, Famiglia e Minori-Il Sole 24 Ore, Commentarium, Monitor Ecclesiasticus, Scientia Canonica, Studium, Suprema Lex and New Experiences of Juvenile Justice. He began his academic career in 2006 as a teaching assistant in Children’s Rights at LUMSA University in Rome, where, in 2009, he also taught in the Master’s Degree in Family Law and Child Law. Following this, he was an assistant professor of Canon Law and Children’s Rights in 2010 at the Pontifical Lateran University, where, in 2013, he won the open competition for a Full Professorship of Canon Law . From 2013 until 2016, he was also an adjunct professor of Canon Law at LUMSA University School of Law. In 2017 he was a guest professor at the Catholic University of Murcia–UCAM, lecturing in Canon Law in the postgraduate diploma in Matrimonial Law. In 2018 he spent the Spring Term as a visiting scholar at Heythrop College, University of London. 

On 25 February 2019, Riondino was appointed as foundation Professor of Canon Law at ACU. He lectures in both International Children’s Rights and Canon Law at ACU’s Thomas More Law School, and in Canon Law at ACU’s School of Theology. From 2020 until 2022, Riondino has also been a visiting professor at John Paul II Pontifical Theological Institute for Marriage and Family Sciences, Madrid campus, where he lectures in International Children’s Rights. In February 2022 he was appointed guest professor at KU Leuven Faculty of Canon Law. 

Riondino has provided keynote addresses at various international conferences in Europe, North America, South America, Africa, Asia and Oceania. He is a member of the Italian Association of Canon Lawyers (ASCAI), Canon Law Society of Australia and New Zealand, and the Consociatio Internationalis Studio Iuris Canonici Promovendo.

Canon Law Centre 
The former Vice-Chancellor and President of ACU, Professor Greg Craven AO, appointed Professor Riondino as the inaugural director of the ACU’s Canon Law Centre, established at the University's North Sydney Campus in September 2019. The Centre is the first of its kind in Oceania and has, as its mission, the promotion and the development of Canon Law, in both its theoretical and practical aspects, in Australia and overseas. The Director, is supported by a board of advisors, composed of ten members, and a board of consultants, consisting of experts from across the world in canon law and related fields. The support provided by this board of consultants includes specialised advice as well as contributions to publications.

One of the most significant endeavours currently being undertaken by the Centre is the development of a new English commentary on the Code of Canon Law. The commentary is being edited and directed by Professor Riondino and is due to be published by St Pauls Australia late in 2022 under the title "The Code of Canon Law: A Commentary". The text will be authored by 30 experts from Australia, Belgium, Brazil, Canada, England, Germany, Ireland, Italy, Philippines, Poland, Spain and United States.

Notable recent assignments and consultancies 
Riondino is a member of scientific committees for two canon law journals: Monitor Ecclesiasticus (Italy) and Vergentis (Spain). Previously, from 2013-2018, he was a member of the editorial board of Apollinaris, the law review of the Pontifical Lateran University School of Comparative Law (i.e. Institutum Utriusque Iuris).

He is also a founding member of the scientific committee for Auribus – Centre for Prevention of Sexual Abuse and Protection of Victims, Rome, and gave a keynote address at its launch in January 2020. At this event, Auribus and the Canon Law Centre established a partnership particularly for the promotion of events and seminars to further the protection of children in the Church.

Riondino is engaged as a legal advisor to both the Archdiocese of Melbourne and the ACU Institute of Child Protection Studies, and as a member of the review panel of the Ecclesiastical Interdiocesan Tribunal of New South Wales and Australian Capital Territory. He was also named as a delegate for the fifth Australian Plenary Council. In 2021, he was appointed a Senior Fellow of PM Glynn Institute, Australian Catholic University. 

In 2012, Riondino was appointed as a lawyer “ad casum” at the Congregation for the Doctrine of the Faith.

Publications

Books 

Ex Corde Ecclesiae: Reflections after 30 years (ed. with A. Casamento), Sydney 2022. .
Introducción al derecho canónico (with Arroba Conde, M. J.), Murcia 2020. .
Introduction to Canon Law  (with Arroba Conde, M. J.), Milano 2019. .
Introduzione al diritto canonico (with Arroba Conde, M. J.), Milano 2019 (2nd edn, 2017; 1st edn, 2015). ;  (electronic).
Giustizia riparativa e mediazione nel diritto penale canonico, Città del Vaticano 2012 (1st edn, 2011). .
Famiglia e Minori. Temi giuridici e canonici, Città del Vaticano 2011. .

Selected articles and book chapters 

 ‘Thirty Years of the Apostolic Constitution Ex Corde Ecclesiae. A Canonical Overview and Future Prospects’ (2021) 55 Studia Canonica, 601-616.
‘Protection of children's rights in the international community and in the Catholic Church: A comparative analysis’ (2020) 77 Revista Española de Derecho Canónico 987-1046. ISSN 0034-9372.
 ‘El paradigma de la Justicia Restaurativa: manifestacion de misericordia en el derecho penal de la Iglesia’ (2020) 10 Vergentis, 83-98. ISSN 2445-2394; ISSN (electronic) 2605-3357.
 ‘Function and application of the penalty in the Code of Canon Law’ (2020) VI Jus Online 143-183. ISSN 1827-7942.
 ‘The 30th anniversary of the Convention on the Rights of the Child and Child Labour exploitation’ (2020) 9 E-Journal of International and Comparative Labour Studies, 90-96. ISSN 2280-4056.
‘The Magisterium of the Church on higher education and its reflection in the Code of Canon Law’ (2019) 3 Jus Online 204-224.
 ‘Reflections on fifty years of Church teaching on Universities (from Gravissimum Educationis to Ex corde Ecclesiae)’ in Whittle, S. (ed), Vatican II and New Thinking about Catholic Education (London – New York, 2017) 207-214. .
 ‘The right to education: a fundamental and universal right’ (2016) LXIII Jus 287-300. ISSN 0022-6955.
 ‘Le sanzioni nella Chiesa’ in Arroba Conde, M. J. (ed), Manuale di Diritto Canonico (Città del Vaticano, 2014) 253-267. .
 ‘La Convenzione di Lanzarote. Aspetti giuridici e canonici in tema di abuso sui minori’ (2013) 86 Apollinaris 149-176. .
 ‘Justiça reparativa e direito penal canônico. Aspectos substanciais’ (2013) 6 Suprema Lex 63-76. ISSN 2236-4137.
 ‘Connessione tra pena canonica e pena statuale’ in AA. VV., Questioni attuali di diritto penale canonico (Città del Vaticano, 2012) 199-226. .
 ‘Mediazione familiare e interculturalità in Europa. Profili di diritto comparato’ (2010) 39 Il Diritto di Famiglia e delle Persone 1845-1870. ISSN 0390-1882.
'Bonum coniugum e giuridicità nel matrimonio canonico' (2009) 38 Il Diritto di Famiglia e delle Persone 2048-2091. ISSN 0390-1882.

References 

Living people
Academic staff of the Libera Università Maria SS. Assunta
21st-century Italian lawyers
Academic staff of the Australian Catholic University
1978 births